The 1970 National 500 was a NASCAR Grand National Series stock car race that was held on October 11, 1970, at Charlotte Motor Speedway in Concord, North Carolina.

There were 14 winged cars involved in the race; including Lorenzen, Baker, Vandiver, Richard Petty, and Glotzbach.

Race report
Out of the 62 cars that were reported as having been entered on October 9, 1970, only 43 of them were properly recorded by NASCAR officials. Former NASCAR star Curtis Turner had formed an agreement with track president Richard Howard to run the race in a one-off, but he was killed in a plane crash days before the event.

Only 40 of 43 officially registered drivers qualified for the starting grid. George Eaton and Buck Baker were recorded as sharing the No. 58 vehicle. Drivers that did not qualify were Buck Baker, George Eaton, Raymond Williams and Dick Polling. Cale Yarborough was credited with the last-place finish on lap 10 due to a crash with the wall. Fifty thousand racing fans would see 23 different lead changes and eight cautions for a period of 63 laps. An unusually lengthy race for the early 1970s, the 1970 National 500 lasted a grueling four hours and three minutes.

This race marked Kmart's debut as a NASCAR sponsor as they backed Fred Lorenzen's white #3 Dodge Daytona. The winged Charger would fly high today as Fast Freddie brought it home with a podium finish and led a few laps en route.

The race was held on a dry circuit; with no precipitation recorded around the speedway.

LeeRoy Yarbrough would defeat Bobby Allison under the yellow flag. This would become Yarbrough's final win in the NASCAR Cup Series. Charlie Glotzbach would qualify for the pole position in this race by driving speeds up to  during the solo sessions. Other notable drivers at this race were David Pearson, Coo Coo Marlin, Frank Warren, Richard Petty and J.D. McDuffie.

A lot of the drivers did not finish the race because of crashes on the track. Eleven notable crew chiefs participated in the race; including Herb Nab, Junie Donlavey, Harry Hyde, Dale Inman, Tom Vandiver and Banjo Matthews. The race car drivers still had to commute to the races using the same stock cars that competed in a typical weekend's race through a policy of homologation (and under their own power). This policy was in effect until roughly 1975. By 1980, NASCAR had completely stopped tracking the year model of all the vehicles and most teams did not take stock cars to the track under their own power anymore.

Qualifying

Top 10 finishers

References

National 500
National 500
National 500
NASCAR races at Charlotte Motor Speedway